Asthenotricha serraticornis is a moth in the family Geometridae first described by William Warren in 1902. It is found in the Democratic Republic of the Congo, Kenya, Malawi, South Africa, Tanzania and Uganda.

References

Moths described in 1902
Asthenotricha
Moths of Africa